This is a list of festivals in Sarajevo, Bosnia and Herzegovina.

Arts and crafts
 Balkan Photo Festival, January
 Beton Fest, July
 FEDU, May
 PitchWise Festival, September
 Pop Art Festival, May
 Pop-Up! Sarajevo, December
 Sarajevo Poetry Days, September
 Sarajevo Street Art Festival, July
 SOS Design Festival, October
 Spiritus Progenitum, November
 WARM Festival, June

Culture, heritage and folk
 American Folk Blues Festival
 Baščaršija Nights, July
 Five Days of Zagreb in Sarajevo, June
 Ilidža Folk Music Festival, July
 Ilidža International Children's Folklore Festival, June
 Sarajevo Irish Festival, March
 Sarajevo Winter Festival, December

Film
 Al Jazeera Balkans Documentary Film Festival, September
 Merlinka Film Festival, January
 Pravo Ljudski Film Festival, November
 Sarajevo Fashion Film Festival, December
 Sarajevo Film Festival, August
 Sarajevo Youth Film Festival, September
 VIVA Film Festival, May

Food
 BeeFest
 Coffee Fest Sarajevo, February
 Sarajevo StreeAt Food Festival, July

Politics and activism
 OPEN Fest Sarajevo, January
 Open University of Sarajevo, November

Religion
 Kao nekad pred Božić, December
 Sarajevo Ramadan Festival, Ramadan

Theatre and Performing arts
 Ballet Fest Sarajevo, September
 InterDance Fest, May
 Juventafest, September
 Lutfest (East Sarajevo), May
 MESS International Theatre Festival, October
 Smile of Sarajevo Theatre Festival, May
 Teatarfest, April

LGBTQ
 Merlinka Festival, January
 Sarajevo Pride, August–September

Music
 Dva Super Dana, April
 Festival 84, March
 Jazz Fest Sarajevo, November
 Sarajevo Beer Festival, July
 Sarajevo Chamber Music Festival, August
 Sarajevo Evenings of Music, May
 Sarajevo International Guitar Festival, April
 Sonemus Fest, April–May
 Orfej (Sarajevo - East Sarajevo), April

Sarajevo-related lists
Annual events in Bosnia and Herzegovina